Wauldby is a region in the Yorkshire Wolds within the civil parish of Welton in the East Riding of Yorkshire, England. It contains the gentrified hamlet around Wauldby Manor Farm, and a few other minor dwellings including Little Wauldby Farm.

Wauldby was once the site of a village; the habitation was abandoned in mediaeval times.

Geography
The area is entirely rural; there are two minor dwellings: Little Waulby Farm and Waulby Manor Farm with church, manor house outbuildings and cottages, and a pond Wauldby Dam. Most of the land is enclosed field system, there are also minor woods and plantations including the Woodland Trust managed Nut Wood and Wauldby Scrogs.

History
Wauldby was recorded in the 11th century Doomsday survey as "Waldbi", with a population, together with Elloughton, of 36 villeins, 3 smallholders and a priest. The name Waldbi is thought to mean "[place] on the wold", and is Scandinavian in origin.

The original village was depopulated during the mediaeval period. The area underwent enclosure after 1796.
In the 1850s the township of Waulby covered  and contained 49 people.

In 1835 a chapel was built on the site of an older chapel of ease by Anne Raikes the then landowner. It was built in Gothic revival 13th century style, and is thought to be designed by J. L. Pearson.

Wauldby Hall, also known as Waulby Manor, was rebuilt in 1839.

The house was refurbished in the 1960s by Francis Johnson. The church's bell cote was removed in 1980, and both the manor and church building became grade II listed buildings in 1988.

Notes

References

Sources

External links

Deserted medieval villages in the East Riding of Yorkshire